Tayfun Belet is a Turkish film director, screenwriter, producer and film editor.

Biography 

Originally born into a family from Urfa/Siverek, was born in Izmir. He was influenced by Yılmaz Güney movies in his early years. He studied high school at Fatma Saygun Anadolu Lisesi and continued studying university at Yaşar University on a full scholarship at the Radio, Cinema and Television department. He then continued his masters at the same school and finished the Art and Design program. He is continuing his academic career as a teacher in the same department. He started filming short films when he was in high school. In 2006, before he started his directing career, he worked as a director assistant for many directors. Tayfun Belet, who has been responsible for 10 documentary-cinema films, has also worked on many commercials for popular brands.

He has directed many series of documentaries for outsourcing internationally. He generally uses the themes of women, children and hope in his films. He utilizes the traditional culture of the east and infuses it with the modern life of the west. He has adopted an aesthetic focus in his work. Tayfun Belet is internationally accepted as one of the main representers of Turkish documentary-cinema. His films have met their viewers in over 30 countries. His films have been the subject in many magazines and newspapers, especially in America, India, France and Germany. He has been a part of the jury in many film festivals and has advised many festival documentary-cinema films. For the music in his films, he has worked with Erkin Koray, Hüsnü Şenlendirici, Cengiz Onural, İncesaz, Jah Wobble and Ömer Oral. He has taken responsibility of editing and directing photography in his movies himself. Tayfun Belet has proven to have his own unique style in cinema and is the owner of the company named Tabu Film Production.

Filmography

References

External links
 
 Tayfun Belet on Turkish Cinema Archive KameraArkası
 Tayfun Belet on CinemaTürk

Living people
Turkish film directors
Turkish film editors
Turkish film producers
Turkish male screenwriters
Year of birth missing (living people)